Vasilchenkov is a rural locality (a khutor) in Alexeyevsky District, Belgorod Oblast, Russia. The population was 5 as of 2010. There is 1 street.

Geography 
Vasilchenkov is located 33 km east of Alexeyevka (the district's administrative centre) by road. Ivashchenkovo is the nearest rural locality.

References 

Rural localities in Alexeyevsky District, Belgorod Oblast
Biryuchensky Uyezd